Vangueria madagascariensis, commonly known by the names Spanish-tamarind, tamarind-of-the-Indies, or voa vanga, is a species of flowering plant in the family Rubiaceae native to the African continent having edible fruit. It is the type species of the genus Vangueria and was described in 1791 by Johann Friedrich Gmelin.

Fruit
Vangueria madagascariensis has large, orange fruits that are edible and often consumed locally.

Native distribution
Vangueria madagascariensis is native to Angola, Benin, Cameroon, Central African Republic, the Democratic Republic of the Congo, Ethiopia, Ghana, Kenya, Madagascar, Malawi, Mali, Mozambique,  Nigeria, South Africa (in KwaZuluNatal and Transvaal), Sudan, Eswatini, Tanzania (inclusive of the Zanzibar Archipelago) and Uganda.

References

External links
 World Checklist of Rubiaceae

Fruits originating in Africa
madagascariensis
Plants described in 1791
Taxa named by Johann Friedrich Gmelin
Flora of Cameroon
Flora of the Central African Republic
Flora of the Democratic Republic of the Congo
Flora of Ethiopia
Flora of Ghana
Flora of Kenya
Flora of Madagascar
Flora of Malawi
Flora of Nigeria
Flora of South Africa
Flora of Sudan
Flora of Tanzania
Flora of the Zanzibar Archipelago
Flora of Uganda